Prince Rudolf of Liechtenstein (18 April 1838 – 15 December 1908) was an Austrian aristocrat, a general in the Common Army and one of the highest officials in the court of Emperor Franz Joseph I.

Biography
Rudolf was the youngest child and second son of Prince Karl Joseph of Liechtenstein and Countess Franziska von Wrbna-Freudenthal. His family was a cadet branch of the reigning Princely House of Liechtenstein, the Moravský-Krumlov line, which was descended from Prince Karl Borromäus, the younger brother of Franz Joseph I, Prince of Liechtenstein. Upon the death of his older brother Karl Rudolf – who was unmarried and childless – in 1899, Rudolf became head of the family.

After completing his education, Rudolf joined the military, eventually becoming General of the Cavalry in 1904. In 1862 he entered the service of the imperial court in Vienna, first as treasurer and later, privy councilor and Acting Minister of the Horse, as well as an honorary colonel of the Imperial Life-guards. In 1896 he was personally appointed by the Emperor as First Oberhofmeister (Lord High Steward), the premier official of the court, after the death of Prince Konstantin of Hohenlohe-Schillingsfürst. Rudolf's tenure at court was fraught with multiple events: the Badeni riots in Bohemia in 1897, the assassination of the Empress Elisabeth in 1898, and the morganatic marriage of Archduke Franz Ferdinand to Countess Sophie Chotek in 1900. He was also present during the state visits of King Edward VII of the United Kingdom, Kaiser Wilhelm II of Germany and Tsar Nicholas II of Russia in 1903.

An accomplished musician, Rudolf composed music for the texts of Walther von der Vogelweide and Heinrich Heine.

In the later years of his life, Rudolf was often plagued by illness; his duties were taken over by his deputy Alfred, 2nd Prince of Montenuovo. He eventually died unmarried in 1908, and was interred in the family crypt in Moravský Krumlov castle, Moravia. With his death, the Moravský-Krumlov line of the House of Liechtenstein became extinct.

Honours
National orders and decorations
 Knight of the Golden Fleece, 1892
 Grand Cross of the Royal Hungarian Order of St. Stephen, 1896
 Golden Jubilee Court Medal, 1898
 Golden Jubilee Medal for the Armed Forces, 1898
 Service Award for Officers, 3rd Class

Foreign orders and decorations

Ancestry

References

Sources 
 

19th-century Austrian people
20th-century Austrian people
1838 births
1908 deaths
Austrian Roman Catholics
Austrian composers
Nobility from Vienna
Austro-Hungarian Army officers
Austro-Hungarian generals
Princes of Liechtenstein
Members of the House of Lords (Austria)

Knights of the Golden Fleece of Austria
Grand Crosses of the Order of Saint Stephen of Hungary

Grand Officiers of the Légion d'honneur
Grand Cordons of the Order of the Rising Sun
Knights Grand Cross of the Order of Saints Maurice and Lazarus
Bailiffs Grand Cross of Honour and Devotion of the Sovereign Military Order of Malta
Grand Crosses of the Order of the Star of Romania
Honorary Knights Grand Cross of the Royal Victorian Order
Recipients of the Order of the White Eagle (Russia)
Recipients of the Order of St. Anna, 1st class
Recipients of the Order of Saint Stanislaus (Russian), 1st class
Knights of the Order of Saint Joseph
Obersthofmeister